Evlyn Fenwick Farris (21 August 1878 – 5 November 1971) was a scholar and advocate for continuing education and women's rights. She was the founder of the first University Women's Club of Vancouver, and was elected to the Senate of the University of British Columbia.

Early life and education 
Evlyn Fenwick Farris was born Evlyn Keirstead in Windsor, Nova Scotia to Mary Jane Fenwick and Miles Kierstead, a Baptist Minister. Her mother and newborn brother died in 1890 of tuberculosis and bronchitis.

In 1892, Evlyn entered Horton Collegial Academy, a Baptist high school. In 1894, she began her studies at Acadia College (now Acadia University) in Wolfville, Nova Scotia. At Acadia College, she began to write about the role of women in society and her strong beliefs that women and men should have the same access to education.

In 1905,  she married and moved to British Columbia with John Wallace de Beque Farris, a Vancouver lawyer and politician.

University Women's Club of Vancouver 
In 1907 Evlyn Fenwick Farris helped found the University Women's Club of Vancouver (UWCV), a social club for university-educated women and became its first President.  The UWCV encouraged the founding of a provincial university and promoted a variety of socially progressive causes.

University of British Columbia 

In 1917 Evlyn Fenwick Farris became the first woman in Canada to be appointed to the board of governors of a university — a founding governor of the University of British Columbia. She was also the first woman to be appointed to the UBC Senate. Active in its formation, the University Women's Club of Vancouver considered UBC as its "godchild".

References

External links
 Farris Family Archives at the University of British Columbia, Rare Books and Special Collections
 www.uwcvancouver.ca - University Women's Club of Vancouver
 www.uwctoronto.ca - University Women’s Club of Toronto - Our History
 www.cfuw.org - Canadian Federation of University Women - Our Story, The Beginning of CFUW
 www.graduatewomen.org - Graduate Women International - GWI History
 www.library.ubc.ca/archives - Vancouver Sun, Feb 17, 1916, BC University Senate Meets for the First Time, p36

Further reading
 Sylvie McClean, A Woman of Influence: Evlyn Fenwick Farris. Sono Nis Press; 1st edition (Jan. 1 1997).

1878 births
1971 deaths
Canadian feminists
University of British Columbia alumni